Who's Who in the Zoo is a 1942 Warner Bros. Looney Tunes cartoon directed by Norman McCabe. The short was released on February 14, 1942.

Plot
Who's Who in the Zoo is one of the cartoons that Warner would occasionally produce, particularly in the World War II era, that featured a series of loosely related gags, usually based on outrageous stereotypes and plays on words, as a narrator (in this case Robert C. Bruce) describes the action. The plot is substantially similar to that of 1939's A Day at the Zoo, except that Porky Pig (voiced by Mel Blanc as usual) appears as the zookeeper of the "Azusa Zoo," and that the now-discontinued Egghead is absent. Some excerpts:

In a comic "triple", a timber wolf is shown, then a gray wolf, then a "Hollywood wolf" (a frequent reference in the 1940s WB cartoons).
Other creatures include a "missing lynx", a "tortoise and the hair", "March hares" who march to a drumbeat, a down-on-his-luck "bum steer", an Indian elephant attired as an American Indian, and a bald eagle wearing a toupee.
There is also a running joke about a lion who is awaiting the arrival of the ice cream truck.
An Alaskan Bear who's known for hugging its prey to death picks up and starts hugging a defenseless sheep. When the narrator begs the bear to stop hugging the sheep, the sheep responds, in a feminine voice sounding like Sterling Holloway: "Oh, for goodness' sake, mind your own business!"
A group of seals that the narrator says only eat fresh mountain trout. Porky attempts to feed them a mackerel instead, claiming it to be indistinguishable, but a seal plants a sign saying "No substitutes accepted".
Some gags reference the then-ongoing World War II, including a black panther drinking cream from its dish, then noticing the dish is aluminum and throwing it into a scrap pile, a reference to the Salvage for Victory campaign; as well as a distressed rabbit father of dozens of babies given a note from the government to "increase your production 100%," as the song "What's The Matter with Father" plays in the background.

See also
Looney Tunes and Merrie Melodies filmography (1940–1949)
List of Porky Pig cartoons

References

External links

1942 films
1942 animated films
1940s American animated films
1940s animated short films
American black-and-white films
Looney Tunes shorts
Films directed by Norman McCabe
Films scored by Carl Stalling
Porky Pig films
Animated films about wolves
Animated films about cats
Films about turtles
Animated films about rabbits and hares
Films about cattle
Animated films about elephants
Animated films about birds
Animated films about lions
Animated films about bears
Films about sheep
Films set in zoos
1940s English-language films